Pratappur is a Rural municipality located within the Parasi District of the Lumbini Province of Nepal.
The rural municipality spans  of area, with a total population of 41,315 according to a 2011 Nepal census.

On March 10, 2017, the Government of Nepal restructured the local level bodies into 753 new local level structures.
The previous Pratappur, Thulo Khairatawa, Baidauli, Guthi Parsauni, Guthisuryapura and portions of Jamuniya & Somani VDCs were merged to form Pratappur Rural Municipality.
Pratappur is divided into 9 wards, with Pratappur VDC declared the administrative center of the rural municipality.

References

External links
official website of the rural municipality

Rural municipalities in Parasi District
Rural municipalities of Nepal established in 2017